Cunardo is a comune (municipality) in the Province of Varese in the Italian region Lombardy, located about  northwest of Milan and about  north of Varese.

Cunardo borders the following municipalities: Bedero Valcuvia, Cugliate-Fabiasco, Ferrera di Varese, Grantola, Masciago Primo, Valganna.

Demographic evolution

References

Cities and towns in Lombardy